Árpád Csonka (born 24 August 1991) is a Slovak football striker of Hungarian ethnicity who currently plays for the Corgoň Liga club FK DAC 1904 Dunajská Streda.

External links
 at fcdac1904.com

References

1991 births
Living people
Association football forwards
Slovak footballers
FC DAC 1904 Dunajská Streda players
Slovak Super Liga players
Hungarians in Slovakia